The Swing Wing is a toy worn on the head and twirled by moving the neck and/or body in a back and forth motion, similar to the Hula Hoop. It was developed by Transogram Games and introduced in 1965. It gave people concussions due to the swinging force of the blade.

The toy has received recent notoriety appearing on several television shows, including Fox News Channel's late night show Red Eye with Greg Gutfeld on May 22, 2008, G4's Attack of the Show!, The Ellen DeGeneres Show and the Adult Swim game, Jazzpunk as well as The Gruen Transfer, Good Mythical Morning, and the Roly YouTube channel.

References

Physical activity and dexterity toys